Peniarth 6 is a medieval Welsh manuscript. It is part of the  collection of Peniarth Manuscripts, named for Peniarth Mansion in Meirionnydd, south Gwynedd, where they were kept for many years.

Among the texts are parts of the Four Branches of the Mabinogi, the oldest text existing. It dates to the period circa 1225-1275. Peniarth 6 is kept in the National Library of Wales, Aberystwyth.

Welsh manuscripts
Peniarth collection
13th-century books
Medieval documents of Wales